The Duke of Mount Deer is a Hong Kong television series adapted from Louis Cha's novel The Deer and the Cauldron, produced by TVB and starring Andy Lau and Tony Leung. It was first aired on TVB Jade in from  9 July to 31 August 1984.

Cast

 Note: Some of the characters' names are in Cantonese romanisation.

External links
 

1984 Hong Kong television series debuts
1984 Hong Kong television series endings
TVB dramas
Works based on The Deer and the Cauldron
Hong Kong wuxia television series
Hong Kong comedy television series
Martial arts television series
Television series set in the Qing dynasty
Cantonese-language television shows
Television shows based on works by Jin Yong